FGI-106 is a broad-spectrum antiviral drug developed as a potential treatment for enveloped RNA viruses, in particular viral hemorrhagic fevers from the bunyavirus, flavivirus and filovirus families. It acts as an inhibitor which blocks viral entry into host cells. In animal tests FGI-106 shows both prophylactic and curative action against a range of deadly viruses for which few existing treatments are available, including the bunyaviruses hantavirus, Rift Valley fever virus and Crimean-Congo hemorrhagic fever virus, the flavivirus dengue virus, and the filoviruses Ebola virus and Marburg virus.

See also 
 Brincidofovir
 BCX4430
 Favipiravir
 FGI-103
 FGI-104
 LJ-001
 TKM-Ebola
 ZMapp

References 

Anti–RNA virus drugs
Antiviral drugs
Ebola
Experimental drugs
Nitrogen heterocycles
Heterocyclic compounds with 4 rings